Paranapis is a genus of South Pacific araneomorph spiders in the family Anapidae, first described by Norman I. Platnick & Raymond Robert Forster in 1989.  it contains only two species, both found in New Zealand.

References

Anapidae
Araneomorphae genera
Spiders of New Zealand
Taxa named by Raymond Robert Forster